Artsul Futebol Clube, usually known simply as Artsul, is a Brazilian football team from the city of Nova Iguaçu in the state of Rio de Janeiro, founded on 19 June 2001. It is part of the Grupo Artsul, a company specialising in concrete.

The greatest success of the team has been the second place in the third division of the Rio de Janeiro state championship in 2002. Alemão, who played between 2004 and 2007 for the first division clubs Coritiba FC and SE Palmeiras as well as in Japan and Francisco Anderson Huaiquipán, are probably the best known players that came from the ranks of the club.

Stadium
The home stadium is Estádio Nivaldo Pereira named after the club founder.

Colors
The official colors are blue, green and white.

External links
Artsul Futebol Clube af FFERJ

 
Association football clubs established in 2001
Football clubs in Rio de Janeiro (state)
2001 establishments in Brazil